Atyriodes is a genus of moths in the family Geometridae described by Warren in 1895.

Species
 Atyriodes cyrene (Druce, 1885)
 Atyriodes janeira (Schaus, 1892)

References

Sterrhinae
Geometridae genera